Petr Rosol (born June 20, 1964) is a Czech former professional ice hockey forward. He played in the 1992 Olympic ice hockey for Czechoslovakia where he won a bronze medal. He was drafted 75th overall by the Calgary Flames in the 1984 NHL Entry Draft.

Career statistics

Regular season and playoffs

International

References

External links

1964 births
Living people
People from Znojmo
Calgary Flames draft picks
Czechoslovak ice hockey right wingers
Czech ice hockey right wingers
EHC Visp players
HC Litvínov players
HC Dukla Jihlava players
HC Lugano players
HC Martigny players
HC Sierre players
Ice hockey players at the 1988 Winter Olympics
Ice hockey players at the 1992 Winter Olympics
Olympic bronze medalists for Czechoslovakia
Olympic ice hockey players of Czechoslovakia
Olympic medalists in ice hockey
Medalists at the 1992 Winter Olympics
SHC Fassa players
Czechoslovak expatriate sportspeople in Italy
Sportspeople from the South Moravian Region
Czech expatriate ice hockey players in Switzerland
Czech expatriate ice hockey players in Germany
Expatriate ice hockey players in Italy
Czechoslovak expatriate ice hockey people